Voltron: The Third Dimension is an American computer-animated television series, done in the same animation style as Beast Wars: Transformers and ReBoot. It departed from the original Lion Voltron's animated look, as well as some character changes, such as the physical appearance of Prince Lotor (now voiced by Tim Curry, taking over the role originally voiced by Lennie Weinrib). It served as a sequel to the Lion Force Voltron series, set five years after the end of the series (ignoring events from episodes 53 to 72), and among the tools used to bridge the gap was an official starmap as designed by writer Shannon Muir, and finalized in partnership with World Events Productions. The show was animated by Netter Digital Entertainment, inc. and Mike Young Productions.

Legal issues occurred when WEP tried to make a new series. Neil Ross, Michael Bell, and B.J. Ward reprised their roles as Keith, Lance, and Princess Allura for the series.

Plot
The story takes place in the Denubian Galaxy. Shannon Muir mapped the galaxy in the 1980s as a fan and posted it online. In 1996, World Event Productions became aware of the work and made it the official starmap for the show.

With antagonist Prince Lotor's escape from prison, the heroic Voltron Force re-assemble against him, but must contend simultaneously with the various monsters and warships sent by Lotor (at times, captained by him) and with opposition on their own side, represented by the artificial intelligence "Amalgamus", a sophisticated computer who objects periodically to the Voltron Force's methods.

Cast
 Clancy Brown – Queeque and Igor
 Michael Bell – Lance and Coran
 Tim Curry – King Alfor and Prince Lotor
 Tress MacNeille – Lafitte 
 Kevin Michael Richardson – Hunk, King Zarkon, and Narrator 
 Neil Ross –  Keith and Amalgamus 
 B.J. Ward – Princess Allura and Haggar
 Billy West – Pidge

Episodes

Season 1 (1998–1999)

Season 2 (1999–2000)

Home media
The series was first made available through a combination of Netflix and Vudu accounts through the Xbox 360 console. Episodes would have to be purchased individually. The first season was available in full on iTunes for $15 but, like its sister property Voltron: Defender of the Universe, it has been removed from the iTunes and Google Play stores, although the soundtrack for the series is still available for purchase.

Awards
The show won a 1999 Daytime Emmy for Outstanding Sound Editing – Special Class Rick Hinson (supervising sound editor), for Elizabeth Hinson.

References

External links
 
 
 . Pages created by the developer of the official Denubian Galaxy Starmap.

1998 American television series debuts
2000 American television series endings
1990s American animated television series
2000s American animated television series
1990s American science fiction television series
2000s American science fiction television series
American children's animated action television series
American children's animated space adventure television series
American children's animated science fantasy television series
American computer-animated television series
American sequel television series
Anime-influenced Western animated television series
English-language television shows
Voltron
Television series by Universal Television
First-run syndicated television programs in the United States
Television series by Splash Entertainment